Shrines of Gaiety is a novel by British author Kate Atkinson, published in 2022 by Doubleday.

Plot 
Set in London in the Roaring Twenties, the book centres on the infamous London nightclubs owned by  Nellie Coker (loosely based on Kate Meyrick, the 1920's London nightclub proprietor) and her son Niven, the latter having returned from fighting in the Somme in World War I. Their movements are carefully watched by police inspector Frobisher. Librarian and former combat nurse Gwendolen Kelling is approached by an old friend asking her to track down her missing teenage daughters in London. Kelling enlists Frobisher's help, and their hunt leads them to Coker's nightclubs.

Reception 

Anthony Quinn of The Guardian found "a slight disappointment" in what he called "the slapdash ending", but added that "Nonetheless, this book is one to savour, for the energy, for the wit, for the tenderness of characterisation that make Atkinson enduringly popular."

Anthony Cummins of The Guardian praised "the suppleness that enables Atkinson to segue from scenes of pitch-dark horror to a brisk 'what everyone did next' coda without sugar-coating the tale’s bitter kernel: it’s a peak performance of consummate control."

Leah Greenblatt wrote in the New York Times that the novel 

Sarah Chihaya of The New Yorker wrote that

References 

2022 British novels
Novels by Kate Atkinson
Doubleday (publisher) books
Novels set in London
Novels set in the Roaring Twenties